Jyotsna Srikanth is an Indian violinist and composer, performing Carnatic music and Western classical music.

Early life
Jyotsna Srikanth was born in an Andhra musical family in Bangalore, India. Her mother, Ratna Srikantaiah, is a Carnatic musician and teacher.

Musical life

Training
Jyotsna's music training began with Carnatic vocals at age five under her mother. It was a rigorous programme of coaching, with practice for six hours daily, and the attendance of concerts during the festival periods.

At the age of six, she attended a violin performance by the virtuoso Kunnakudi Vaidyanathan, which sparked her own interest in the instrument. She began training under R. R. Keshavamurthy, a doyen of classical Indian violin. Her first solo concert was at the age of nine.

Jyotsna recognised the necessity of learning the western classical style of violin to become a violinist, and began her training in this genre at the Bangalore School of Music. For more advanced training, she went to Chennai to study with V. S. Narasimhan, a solo violinist who works with the notable Indian composer Ilaiyaraaja. She achieved her grading from the Royal School of Music, London.

Career
Jyotsna's initial foray into music came in the film industry, playing under the direction of film composers such as Hamsalekha and Ilaiyaraaja. By her account, she has played for over two hundred south Indian films.

Following her marriage, she moved to London, where she expanded her repertoire to music scores for documentaries (on Discovery and National Geographic), teleserials, besides performing at global music events such as WOMAD, the Red Violin Festival, the Cleveland Thyagaraja Festival, and the BBC Proms.

Jyotsna also performs jazz and fusion, and has set up a troupe called Fusion Dreams,. She has collaborated with the classical guitarist Simon Thacker, and the flamenco/jazz guitarist Eduardo Niebla., as well as Fado saxophonist Rão Kyao.

Jyotsna has lectured on comparative techniques between the Indian and western classical violin at University of Cambridge and Liverpool University.

She established a foundation Dhruva to help upcoming Indian artistes to perform in the United Kingdom, as well as raise funds for charity.

In 2012, she organised the London International Arts Festival, a series of concerts of Carnatic, fusion, folk and Balkan music, as well as dance performances from Cyprus and India.

Jyotsna continues her Carnatic music career as a soloist and as an accompanist, and has accompanied masters such as Dr M. Balamuralikrishna, Kadri Gopalnath, Chitravina Ravikiran, Ranjani-Gayatri, Sudha Ragunathan, Jayanthi Kumaresh, Sanjay Subrahmanyan, Nithyasree Mahadevan, R. K. Srikantan  Aruna Sairam, A K Palanivel, .

Srikanth specialises in the following Indian composers: Thyagaraja, Purandara Dasaru, Papanasam Sivan, Annamacharya, Muthuswami Dikshitar, Shyama Sastri and Mysore Vasudevachar. Jyotsna hosts London International Arts Festival and is the Artistic Director of Dhruv Arts, in the U.K.

Acclaim

Her violin playing and music style has been referred to as "amazing".

In 2008, she received a Fellowship in Carnatic Music from the Trinity College of Music, London.

Personal life
Jyotsna is a practising pathologist, having received MBBS and Post-Graduate degrees in Clinical Pathology from Bangalore Medical College, India. She is married to K.V. Srikanth Sharma, has two children and lives in Bangalore presently.

Discography

 Carnatic Lounge, Times Music, 2011.
 Chants for Children, Theme Musik, 2011.
 Carnatic Jazz, Swathi Sanskriti, 2011.
 Alaiapayudhe, CD Baby, 2010.
 Fusion Dreams, CD Baby, 2008.
 Insight, Fountain Music, 2008.
 Life, Earthnbeat, 2007.
 Carnatic Connection, 2016

References

External links

 Jyotsna Srikanth 

Indian violinists
Living people
Carnatic violinists
Musicians from Bangalore
Indian classical composers
Indian women composers
20th-century Indian composers
Women violinists
Indian pathologists
Women pathologists
Telugu people
Indian music educators
Women educators from Karnataka
Educators from Karnataka
20th-century Indian educators
20th-century violinists
Women Carnatic singers
Carnatic singers
Carnatic composers
Indian women classical musicians
Indian women medical doctors
20th-century Indian medical doctors
Year of birth missing (living people)
20th-century Indian women musicians
Film musicians from Karnataka
Medical doctors from Bangalore
Women musicians from Karnataka
20th-century women physicians
Women music educators
21st-century violinists
20th-century women composers
20th-century women educators